Renê dos Santos Júnior (born 16 September 1989) is a Brazilian footballer who plays as a midfielder for Chapecoense.

Career
Renê began his professional career on Rio de Janeiro's lower clubs, before joining Figueirense. However, one year after, he joined Esporte Clube Democrata. Shortly after, he joined Salgueiro Atlético Clube.

In January 2012 he signed a contract with Mogi Mirim Esporte Clube, and after a good campaign in 2012 Campeonato Paulista, he joined Associação Atlética Ponte Preta. He made his Série A debut on 20 May, against Atlético Mineiro. He scored his first top flight goal on 6 June, against Flamengo.

On 2 January 2013, he signed a one-year contract with Santos FC.

On 24 December 2013, Chinese Super League club Guangzhou Evergrande announced that they had signed Renê on a four-year contract. According to Brazilian media, the transfer fee was 3.2 million Brazilian real (1 million Euro). On 8 March 2014, Renê made his debut for Guangzhou in the first league match of the season against Henan Jianye. He scored his first goal in China in the second half, which ensured Guangzhou win the match 3–0. In March 2016 it was announced that Renê's contract with the club had been terminated and he would leave as a free agent.

He returned to Ponte Preta on 1 April 2016.

Career statistics

Honours 
Bahia
Copa do Nordeste: 2017
Guangzhou Evergrande	
Chinese Super League: 2014
Corinthians
Campeonato Paulista: 2018

References

External links
 

1989 births
Living people
Brazilian footballers
Association football midfielders
Campeonato Brasileiro Série A players
Madureira Esporte Clube players
Figueirense FC players
Salgueiro Atlético Clube players
Mogi Mirim Esporte Clube players
Associação Atlética Ponte Preta players
Santos FC players
Esporte Clube Bahia players
Sport Club Corinthians Paulista players
Coritiba Foot Ball Club players
Associação Chapecoense de Futebol players
Guangzhou F.C. players
Brazilian expatriate footballers
Expatriate footballers in China
Brazilian expatriate sportspeople in China
Chinese Super League players
Footballers from Rio de Janeiro (city)